Spyridium montanum is a species of flowering plant in the family Rhamnaceae and is endemic to the Stirling Range in the south of Western Australia. It is an erect shrub with elliptic or egg-shaped leaves, and groups of up to ten densely hairy, white or cream-coloured flowers.

Description
The edges of the leaves turn down and the upper surface is densely hairy. Flowering occurs from April to July and in October.

Taxonomy
Spyridium montanum was first formally described in 1995 by Barbara Lynette Rye in the Nuytsia from specimens collected by Alex George near the eastern end of the Stirling Range in 1970. The specific epithet (montanum) means "pertaining to a mountain".

Distribution
This spyridium is only known from the Stirling Range where it often grows in gullies on the higher parts of the mountains.

Conservation status
Spyridium montanum is listed as "Priority Two" by the Western Australian Government Department of Biodiversity, Conservation and Attractions, meaning that it is poorly known and from only one or a few locations.

References

montanum
Rosales of Australia
Flora of Western Australia
Plants described in 1995
Taxa named by Barbara Lynette Rye